Junji Ikomais a retired Japanese mixed martial artist from Osaka, Japan, who competed in the strawweight and flyweight division. He has fought throughout his career exclusively for the Shooto organization and is currently a part of Shooto's provisional association. Ikoma is a former Shooto World Flyweight (114 lb) Champion. Fight Matrix ranks him as the #15 all time strawweight.

Martial arts career
Ikoma made his debut aged 31, during Shooto - To The Top 5, when he faced Homare Kuboyama in the 123 lbs category. He lost a unanimous decision. He would lose again against Tomohiro Hashi. He bounced back with a win against Toshiteru Ishii, but lost his next fight against Masatoshi Abe.

From there he went on a five fight unbeaten streak, with a 4-0-1 record, beating Yasuhiro Akagi by RNC, Tomohiro Hashi by kimura in a rematch, drawing against Masatoshi Abe, and further beating Hiroaki Yoshioka and Takeyasu Hirono.

Ikoma lost a UD when he faced Robson Moura, won against Ichaku Murata by a triangle choke. He lost another UD against Yasuhiro Urushitani, and beat Homare Kuboyama by TKO. After accumulating a 2-3 record, he went on another five fight unbeaten streak, most notably drawing Jin Akimoto twice. His fights against Akimoto marked his 115 lbs debut.

Over the next two years he achieved a 1-3-2 record, but was nonetheless given a chance to fight for the Shooto World Flyweight (114 lb) Championship, after Rambaa Somdet vacated the title, following a left biceps injury. Ikoma won his first major career title at the age of 41, ten years after his pro debut. He was subsequently scheduled to make his first title defense against Mikihito Yamagami. Ikoma lost in the first minute, of the first round, by way of KO.

Junji Ikoma's last fight was in 2012, when he lost against Tadaaki Yamamoto, through a second round rear naked choke. He announced his retirement after the fight.

Championships and accomplishments
Shooto
2000 West Japan Amateur Shooto Tournament Featherweight (132 lbs) Championship
2001 Chubu Amateur Shooto Tournament Bantamweight (123 lbs) Championship
Shooto World Flyweight (114 lb) Championship (One time)

Mixed martial arts record

|-
| Loss
| align=center| 14-14-6
| Tadaaki Yamamoto
| Submission (rear naked choke)
| Shooto: Border: Season 4: First
| 
| align=center| 2
| align=center| 1:13
| Osaka, Japan
| 
|-
| Loss
| align=center| 14-13-6
| Mikihito Yamagami
| KO (punch)
| Shooto: Shooto the Shoot 2011
| 
| align=center| 1
| align=center| 0:41
| Tokyo, Japan
| Lost Shooto Flyweight (114 lbs) Championship
|-
| Win
| align=center| 14-12-6
| Junji Ito
| Decision (unanimous)
| Shooto: Shooto Tradition 2011
| 
| align=center| 3
| align=center| 5:00
| Tokyo, Japan
| Wins Shooto Flyweight (114 lbs) Championship
|-
| Draw
| align=center| 13-12-6
| Takeshi Sato
| Draw
| Shooto: Border: Season 3: Spring Thunder
| 
| align=center| 3
| align=center| 5:00
| Osaka, Japan
| 
|-
| Win
| align=center| 13-12-5
| Teppei Masuda
| Submission (triangle choke)
| Shooto: Border: Season 2: Immovable
| 
| align=center| 1
| align=center| 2:12
| Osaka, Japan
| 
|-
| Draw
| align=center| 12-12-5
| Atsushi Takeuchi
| Draw
| Shooto: Gig West 12
| 
| align=center| 3
| align=center| 5:00
| Osaka, Japan
| 
|-
| Loss
| align=center| 12-12-4
| Noboru Tahara
| TKO (punches)
| Shooto: Border: Season 2: Vibration
| 
| align=center| 3
| align=center| 3:31
| Osaka, Japan
| 
|-
| Loss
| align=center| 12-11-4
| Ayumu Shioda
| Submission (armbar)
| Shooto: Border: Season 1: Clash
| 
| align=center| 2
| align=center| 3:49
| Osaka, Japan
| 
|-
| Loss
| align=center| 12-10-4
| Ryuichi Miki
| Decision (unanimous)
| Shooto: Shooto Tradition Final
| 
| align=center| 3
| align=center| 5:00
| Tokyo, Japan
| 
|-
| Win
| align=center| 12-9-4
| Fumihiro Kitahara
| Decision (majority)
| Shooto: Border: Season 1: Outbreak
| 
| align=center| 2
| align=center| 5:00
| Osaka, Japan
| 
|-
| Draw
| align=center| 11-9-4
| Takuya Mori
| Draw
| Shooto: Gig North 3
| 
| align=center| 3
| align=center| 5:00
| Sapporo, Japan
| 
|-
| Win
| align=center| 11-9-3
| Yusei Shimokawa
| Submission (triangle choke)
| Shooto: 10/13 in Kitazawa Town Hall
| 
| align=center| 1
| align=center| 2:23
| Tokyo, Japan
| 
|-
| Draw
| align=center| 10-9-3
| Jin Akimoto
| Draw
| Shooto: Shooting Disco 5: Earth, Wind and Fighter
| 
| align=center| 3
| align=center| 5:00
| Tokyo, Japan
| 
|-
| Draw
| align=center| 10-9-2
| Jin Akimoto
| Draw
| Shooto: Back To Our Roots 7
| 
| align=center| 3
| align=center| 5:00
| Tokyo, Japan
| 
|-
| Loss
| align=center| 10-9-1
| Yuki Shojo
| Decision (unanimous)
| Shooto: Shooting Disco 3: Everybody Fight Now
| 
| align=center| 2
| align=center| 5:00
| Tokyo, Japan
| 
|-
| Win
| align=center| 10-8-1
| Toshimichi Akagi
| Decision (split)
| Shooto: Battle Mix Tokyo 2
| 
| align=center| 2
| align=center| 5:00
| Tokyo, Japan
| 
|-
| Loss
| align=center| 9-8-1
| Yasuhiro Urushitani
| Decision (unanimous)
| Shooto: 11/10 in Korakuen Hall
| 
| align=center| 3
| align=center| 5:00
| Tokyo, Japan
| 
|-
| Loss
| align=center| 9-7-1
| Masatoshi Abe
| TKO (eye injury)
| Shooto 2006: 7/21 in Korakuen Hall
| 
| align=center| 1
| align=center| 2:06
| Tokyo, Japan
| 
|-
| Win
| align=center| 9-6-1
| Daiji Takahashi
| Submission (triangle choke)
| Shooto: 3/24 in Korakuen Hall
| 
| align=center| 3
| align=center| 3:50
| Tokyo, Japan
| 
|-
| Win
| align=center| 8-6-1
| Hiroaki Yoshioka
| Submission (rear naked choke)
| Shooto: 5/8 in Osaka Prefectural Gymnasium
| 
| align=center| 3
| align=center| 1:36
| Osaka, Japan
| 
|-
| Loss
| align=center| 7-6-1
| Mamoru Yamaguchi
| Decision (unanimous)
| Shooto: 1/29 in Korakuen Hall
| 
| align=center| 3
| align=center| 5:00
| Tokyo, Japan
| 
|-
| Win
| align=center| 7-5-1
| Homare Kuboyama
| TKO (cut)
| Shooto: Rookie Tournament 2004 Final
| 
| align=center| 1
| align=center| 3:57
| Tokyo, Japan
| 
|-
| Loss
| align=center| 6-5-1
| Yasuhiro Urushitani
| Decision (unanimous)
| Shooto: 7/16 in Korakuen Hall
| 
| align=center| 3
| align=center| 5:00
| Tokyo, Japan
| 
|-
| Win
| align=center| 6-4-1
| Ichaku Murata
| Submission (triangle choke)
| Shooto 2004: 4/11 in Osaka Prefectural Gymnasium
| 
| align=center| 2
| align=center| 1:16
| Osaka, Japan
| 
|-
| Loss
| align=center| 5-4-1
| Robson Moura
| Decision (unanimous)
| Shooto: Year End Show 2003
| 
| align=center| 3
| align=center| 5:00
| Urayasu, Japan
| 
|-
| Win
| align=center| 5-3-1
| Takeyasu Hirono
| Decision (unanimous)
| Shooto: Who is Young Leader!
| 
| align=center| 3
| align=center| 5:00
| Tokyo, Japan
| 
|-
| Win
| align=center| 4-3-1
| Hiroaki Yoshioka
| Technical Submission (rear naked choke)
| Shooto: 8/10 in Yokohama Cultural Gymnasium
| 
| align=center| 2
| align=center| 3:26
| Yokohama, Japan
| 
|-
| Draw
| align=center| 3-3-1
| Masatoshi Abe
| Draw
| Shooto: 5/4 in Korakuen Hall
| 
| align=center| 2
| align=center| 5:00
| Tokyo, Japan
| 
|-
| Win
| align=center| 3-3
| Tomohiro Hashi
| Submission (kimura)
| Shooto: 3/18 in Korakuen Hall
| 
| align=center| 1
| align=center| 3:20
| Tokyo, Japan
| 
|-
| Win
| align=center| 2-3
| Yasuhiro Akagi
| Submission (rear-naked choke)
| Shooto: Gig Central 2
| 
| align=center| 1
| align=center| 4:41
| Aichi, Japan
| 
|-
| Loss
| align=center| 1-3
| Masatoshi Abe
| Decision (majority)
| Shooto: Treasure Hunt 8
| 
| align=center| 2
| align=center| 5:00
| Tokyo, Japan
| 
|-
| Win
| align=center| 1-2
| Toshiteru Ishii
| Technical Submission (kimura)
| Shooto: Treasure Hunt 2
| 
| align=center| 1
| align=center| 2:35
| Tokyo, Japan
| 
|-
| Loss
| align=center| 0-2
| Tomohiro Hashi
| Decision (unanimous)
| Shooto: Gig West 2
| 
| align=center| 2
| align=center| 5:00
| Tokyo, Japan
| 
|-
| Loss
| align=center| 0-1
| Homare Kuboyama
| Decision (unanimous)
| Shooto: To The Top 5
| 
| align=center| 2
| align=center| 5:00
| Tokyo, Japan
|

References

External links

Living people
People from Osaka Prefecture
People from Higashiōsaka
Sportspeople from Osaka Prefecture
Japanese male mixed martial artists
Strawweight mixed martial artists
Mixed martial artists utilizing judo
Japanese male judoka
1970 births